The 2014 Utah Utes football team represented the University of Utah during the 2014 NCAA Division I FBS football season. The team was coached by tenth year head coach Kyle Whittingham and played their home games in Rice-Eccles Stadium in Salt Lake City, Utah. They were members of the South Division of the Pac-12 Conference. They finished the season 9–4, 5–4 in Pac-12 play to finish in fifth place in the South Division. They were invited to the Las Vegas Bowl where they defeated Colorado State.

Schedule

Source:

Rankings

Coaching staff

Game summaries

Idaho State

Game officials: Referee - Jack Folliard, Umpire - Douglas Wilson, Head Linesman - Bob Day, Line Judge - Jeff Robinsoni, Side Judge - Aaron Santi, Field Judge - Brad Glenn, Back Judge - Steve Hudson, Head Replay Official - Jim Northcott

Fresno State

Game officials: Referee - Terry Leyden, Umpire - F. Villar, Head Linesman - Rod Ammari, Line Judge - Tim Messuri, Side Judge - Aaron Santi, Field Judge - S. Strimling, Back Judge - Mearl Robinson

Michigan

Game officials: Referee - S. Smith, Umpire - S. Woods, Head Linesman - M. Dolce, Line Judge - J. Baur, Side Judge - D. Swanson, Field Judge - J. Clay, Back Judge - T. Ransom

Washington State

UCLA

Oregon State

USC

Arizona State

Oregon

Stanford

Arizona

Colorado

Las Vegas Bowl: Utah vs. Colorado State

Notes
 September 1, 2014 – Wide receiver Kaelin Clay is named Pac-12 Conference special teams player of the week

References

Utah
Utah Utes football seasons
Las Vegas Bowl champion seasons
Utah Utes football